Solitary cutaneous leiomyoma typically presents as a deeply circumscribed, freely movable, rounded nodule ranging from 2 to 15 mm in diameter, with overlying skin that may have a reddish or violaceous tint.

See also
 Multiple cutaneous leiomyoma
Leiomyoma
Skin lesion

References

 
Dermal and subcutaneous growths